The women's snowboard cross competition of the Sochi 2014 Olympics was held at Rosa Khutor Extreme Park on 16 February 2014.

Schedule
All times are (UTC+4).

Results

Seeding
The seeding was started at 11:00.

Elimination round

Quarterfinals
From here, the athletes participated in six-person elimination races, with the top three from each race advancing.

Quarterfinal 1

Quarterfinal 2

Quarterfinal 3

Quarterfinal 4

Semifinals

Semifinal 1

Semifinal 2

Finals
The finals were started at 13:40.

Small Final

Big Final

References

Women's snowboarding at the 2014 Winter Olympics